Sverre Bjørkkjær (born 12 July 1996) is a Norwegian footballer who plays as a defender for Strømmen. Prior to August 2012, Bjørkkjær has played for third division side, Søgne FK. Bjørkkjær has also played for Norway's national under-18 team at the U18 Lisbon International Tournament.

After spending the start of the 2015 season on loan to Åsane, Bjærkkjær made his first-tier debut for Haugesund in July 2015 as a substitute against Stabæk.

Career statistics

Club

External links
 FK Haugesund Player Profile – Sverre Bjørkkjær (in Norwegian)

References

1996 births
Living people
Norwegian people of Filipino descent
Norwegian footballers
Norway youth international footballers
FK Haugesund players
Åsane Fotball players
Strømmen IF players
Eliteserien players
Norwegian First Division players
Association football fullbacks